Grafton School District is a school district serving the village of Grafton, Ozaukee County, Wisconsin.

Schools
Grafton High School
John Long Middle School
John F. Kennedy Elementary School
Woodview Elementary School

See also
List of school districts in Wisconsin

References

External links
 

School districts in Wisconsin
Education in Ozaukee County, Wisconsin